Hop-Along Cassidy (reissued as Hopalong Cassidy Enters) is a 1935 American Western film that features the character Hop-Along Cassidy created by writer Clarence E. Mulford. This is the first of 66 Hopalong Cassidy films produced between 1935 and 1948 and all starring William Boyd in the title role. William Boyd was originally offered the role of Buck Peters, the ranch foreman, but he decided to take the role of Hop-Along instead.

Plot
A ranch foreman tries to start a range war by playing two cattlemen against each other whilst helping a gang rustle their cattle. Each of the cattlemen blames the other for stealing their cattle. Hop-Along Cassidy, played by William Boyd, having been shot in an earlier gunfight, (which results in his trademark hop), uses an altered cowhide brand to discover the real rustlers. The cattlemen join forces with Hop-Along to bring the rustlers to justice.

Cast
 William Boyd - Bill "Hop-Along" Cassidy
 James Ellison - Johnny Nelson
 Paula Stone - Mary Meeker
 George Hayes - Uncle Ben
 Kenneth Thomson - "Pecos" Jack Anthony
 Frank McGlynn Jr. - Red Connors
 Charles Middleton - Buck Peters
 Robert Warwick - Jim Meeker

Accolades
The film is recognized by American Film Institute in these lists:
 2003: AFI's 100 Years...100 Heroes & Villains:
 Bill "Hop-Along" Cassidy – Nominated Hero

References

External links
 
 
 
 
 Hop-Along Cassidy song - "Following the Stars"

1935 films
Paramount Pictures films
American black-and-white films
Films based on American novels
Films based on Western (genre) novels
1935 Western (genre) films
American Western (genre) films
Hopalong Cassidy films
1930s American films
1930s English-language films